The year 1590 in science and technology involved some significant events.

Botany
 Establishment of Hortus Botanicus Leiden. Its director was Carolus Clusius.

Births
 Marie Fouquet, French medical writer (died 1681)
 approx. date – Giovanni Battista Zupi, Italian astronomer (died 1650)

Deaths
 August 25 - Giulio Alessandrini, Italian physician, author, and poet (born 1506).
 December 20 – Ambroise Paré, French surgeon (born c. 1510).

References

 
16th century in science
1590s in science